Linolenate 9R-lipoxygenase (NspLOX, (9R)-LOX, linoleate 9R-dioxygenase) is an enzyme with systematic name alpha-linolenate:oxygen (9R)-oxidoreductase. This enzyme catalyses the following chemical reaction

 alpha-linolenate + O2  (9R,10E,12Z,15Z)-9-hydroperoxyoctadeca-10,12,15-trienoate

In cyanobacteria the enzyme is involved in oxylipin biosynthesis.

References

External links 
 

EC 1.13.11